Flame of Youth is a 1920 American silent drama film directed by Howard M. Mitchell and starring Shirley Mason, Raymond McKee, and Philo McCullough.

Cast
 Shirley Mason as Beebe
 Raymond McKee as Jeanot
 Philo McCullough as Victor Fleming
 Cecil Van Auker as John Forsythe
 Ethelbert Knott as Antoine
 Betty Schade as Lady Magda
 Karl Formes as Old Bac
 Barbara La Marr

References

Bibliography
 Donald W. McCaffrey & Christopher P. Jacob. Guide to the Silent Years of American Cinema. Greenwood Publishing Group, 1999.

External links

 

1920 films
1920 drama films
1920s English-language films
American silent feature films
Silent American drama films
American black-and-white films
Films directed by Howard M. Mitchell
Fox Film films
1920s American films